Tarkhanabad may refer to:
 Tarkhanabad, Baneh
 Tarkhanabad, Sarvabad